Malaysia–Romania relations refers to foreign relations between Malaysia and Romania. Romania has an embassy in Kuala Lumpur and Malaysia has an embassy in Bucharest.

History 

Following with the establishments of relations with the Soviet Union, Malaysia also expanded it relations with other Eastern European countries such as Poland, Hungary, the Czech Republic, the German Democratic Republic, Yugoslavia and including Romania. Relations between the two countries was established on 22 March 1969.

Economic relations 
In 2011, the total trade stood at $140 million, a jump from $103 million in 2010. While in 2013, trade relations recorded a total of $115.12 million with the Romanian exports consisting of furniture, metals, chemicals, lumber, wood, metal products, machinery and electrical equipment while Malaysian exports including natural rubber and rubber products, tin, cocoa, computer equipment and electronics products.  Both countries are in the process of boosting the economic relations and Romania government has shown interest to co-operate with Malaysia to develop an entry port for palm oil in Romania third largest city, Constanta. Approximately, nine agreements on the economic sector has been signed between the two countries.

Education relations 
In 2013, a framework agreement was signed between 1 Decembrie 1918 University and the National University of Malaysia. As of 2014, there are 120 Malaysian students in Romania with most of them pursuing on the medical courses.

Romanian in Malaysia 
About 100 Romanian reside in the country with most of them reside in the federal territory of Kuala Lumpur and the state of Selangor.

Romanian Association in Malaysia (RAM) 
Romanian Association in Malaysia (RAM) is a non-profit organisation that has been organised and managed by a group of Romanians currently residing in Malaysia and highly interested in promoting the Romanian heritage and to maintaining relationships with other Romanians located in the country.

See also 
 Foreign relations of Malaysia
 Foreign relations of Romania

References

External links
 Romanian Association in Malaysia (RAM)

 
Romania
Bilateral relations of Romania